Tayyar Mehmed Pasha (died 24 December 1638) was an Albanian Ottoman grand vizier. His epithet Tayyar means "flying", referring to his speed in military operations.

Early years 
Mehmet was born to Uçar Mustafa Pasha in Ladik, near the Black Sea. He worked under Nasuh Pasha as his kethüda (chamberlain). After the death of Osman II, he joined the rebellious forces of Abaza Mehmet, but during the battle of Kayseri in 1624, he changed sides and was appointed as the beylerbey (high governor) of Diyarbakır (in modern southeast Turkey).

As grand vizier 
During the campaign of sultan Murat IV for Baghdad (see Ottoman–Safavid War (1623–1639)), he was tasked with guarding Mosul. But when Bayram Pasha, then grand vizier, died on the way to Baghdad, the sultan appointed Tayyar Mehmed Pasha as the new grand vizier.

The siege of Baghdad took more than 40 days. The impatient sultan reprehended the Pasha, who was directing the siege cautiously to minimize losses. After this incident, Tayyar Mehmet Pasha decided for a general attack and personally took part in the fighting on 24 December 1638 in the capture of Baghdad. Although the attack was successful, Tayyar Mehmet Pasha was killed during the fighting. The sultan expressed his sorrow, saying "O Tayyar, You are worth one hundred castles [cities] like Baghdad."  Following Hadım Ali Pasha in 1511 and  Hadım Sinan Pasha in 1517, Tayyar Mehmet Pasha was the third Ottoman grand vizier to be killed in battle. His father had also been killed during a siege of Baghdad in 1625.

References

People from Lâdik
Pashas
17th-century Grand Viziers of the Ottoman Empire
1638 deaths
Ottoman military personnel killed in action
Year of birth unknown
Ottoman people of the Ottoman–Persian Wars